The Key West Cemetery is a  cemetery at the foot of Solares Hill on the island of Key West, Florida, United States.

It is estimated that as many as 100,000 people are buried there, many more than the 30,000 residents who currently live on the island.

It is in the northwest section of the Old Town area of the island.

History
In 1847 it was established at its current location after an 1846 hurricane washed dead bodies from the earlier cemetery out of the coastal sand dunes on Whitehead Point near the West Martello Towers. An African Memorial Cemetery was dedicated beside the West Martello Tower in 2009. Slaves, ill from the sea voyage to slavery in "The New World," were buried there prior to the US Civil War.

In 2005, the cemetery was among those profiled in the PBS documentary A Cemetery Special.

One headstone has a birthdate of 1792.  Another records a death in 1843.

Notable Grave Sites

 “Sloppy” Joe Russell (1889-1941)
 B.P. “Pearl” Roberts (1929-1979) - “I Told you I was Sick.”
 Gloria M. Russell (1926-2000) - “I’m just resting my eyes.”
 Miriam Albury (1882-1933) - Stuffed bunny on the grave for 14+ years

Gallery

References

External links
Aerial View from Google Maps
Key West Cemetery map

Cemetery
Cemetery
Cemetery
Cemeteries in Florida
Protected areas of Monroe County, Florida
1847 establishments in Florida
Historic American Buildings Survey in Florida